The Retiro Island (Portuguese: Ilha do Retiro) is the second largest of the three islands of Lake Paranoá in Brasília, Distrito Federal, Brazil. It is approximately 1.0 hectare, is located close to the ML 7 of Lago Norte neighborhood and is declared Lake Paranoá Ecological Reserve. The other two islands are Paranoá Island and Clubes Island.

Lake islands of Brazil
Landforms of Federal District (Brazil)